Ajay Kapoor may refer to:

 Ajay Kapoor (Neighbours), a character from the Australian television soap opera Neighbours
 Ajay Kapoor (politician) (born 1967), Indian politician